The Last Victim may refer to:
 The Last Victim (book), a non-fiction work by Jason Moss
 The Last Victim (1975 film), a Soviet drama film
 The Last Victim, also known as Forced Entry, a 1975 American horror film
 The Last Victim (2021 film), an American neo-Western crime-thriller film

See also
 The Last Victims, a 2019 political drama film